Duncan E. MacDonald (born January 15, 1949) is an American long-distance runner. He ran collegiately for Stanford University and competed in the men's 5000 metres at the 1976 Summer Olympics. He was also a three-time winner of the Honolulu Marathon, in 1973, 1974 and 1980. In 2017, MacDonald was the boys and girls cross country coach at the Punahou School in Honolulu.

References

External links
 

1949 births
Living people
Athletes (track and field) at the 1976 Summer Olympics
American male long-distance runners
Olympic track and field athletes of the United States
Stanford Cardinal men's track and field athletes
Place of birth missing (living people)
20th-century American people